The Most Noble Order of the Garter was founded by Edward III of England in 1348. Dates shown are of nomination or installation; coloured rows indicate sovereigns, princes of Wales, medieval ladies, modern royal knights and ladies and stranger knights and ladies, none of whom counts toward the 24-member limit.


Knights Founder

Edward III

Richard II

Henry IV

Henry V

Henry VI

Edward IV (First Reign)

Henry VI (Readeption)

Edward IV (Second Reign)

Edward V

Richard III

Henry VII

Henry VIII

Edward VI

Mary I

Elizabeth I

James I

Charles I

Charles II

James II

William & Mary

William III (sole)

Anne

George I

George II

George III (in person)

George, Prince of Wales (as Regent)

George IV (as King)

William IV

Victoria

Edward VII

George V

Edward VIII

George VI

Elizabeth II

Charles III

Banners of current Knights of the Garter

Achievements of select former Knights of the Garter

See also
 List of current members of the Order of the Garter
 List of Knights and Ladies of the Thistle
 List of Knights of St Patrick
 List of Knights Grand Cross of the Order of the Bath
 List of Knights and Dames Grand Cross of the Order of St Michael and St George
 List of Knights Grand Cross of the Order of the British Empire
 Order of the Garter
 St. George's Chapel, Windsor Castle
 The Society of the Friends of St George's and Descendants of the Knights of the Garter
 Windsor Castle

References

External links
 
 St George's Chapel at Windsor Castle: Order of the Garter
 

 
 
Garter